Blabbermouth & Stickybeak is a 1998 Australian live-action film directed by Julian Kemp and starring Mike Bishop and Sally Cooper. It is based on the novel by Morris Gleitzman. The story tells about the young mute girl Rowena Batts who is coming to a new school and is trying to gain friends.

Cast
Helen Neville ... Rowena Batts
Mike Bishop ... Kenny Batts
Sally Cooper ... Ms. Dunning
Robin Cumming ... Mr. Fowler
Will Deumer ... Mr. Peck
Evelyn Krape ... Mrs. Peck
Kane McNally ... Darryn Peck

Awards

Won
Australian Film Institute 1998:
AFI Award – Best Children's Television Drama: Ann Darrouzet
International Emmy Awards 1998:
Emmy Award – Children and Young People: Julian Kemp
Banff Television Festival 1999:
Banff Rockie Award – Best Children's Program

Nominated
Australian Film Institute 1998:
AFI Award – Best Achievement in Direction in a Television Drama: Julian Kemp

References

External links

1998 films
Australian children's films
Films directed by Julian Kemp
1990s English-language films
1990s Australian films